N'Diaga Samb (born August 6, 1966) is a Senegalese draughts player based in the Netherlands. He took first place at the African Championship in 2016, second place at the African Championship in 1992, 2006, 2014, 2018  and finished third in 2003, 2009 and 2010. He won several international tournaments and was awarded the titles of International Master (MI) in 1992 and International Grandmaster (GMI) in 2000.

World Championship
 1992 (14 place)
 2003 (14 place)
 2007 (10 place)
 2013 (1 place in final B)
 2015 (11 place)
 2016 (Blitz) (2 place)
 2019 (16 place)

African Championship
 1992 (2 place)
 2003 (3 place)
 2006 (2 place)
 2009 (3 place)
 2010 (3 place)
 2014 (2 place)
 2016 (1 place)
 2018 (2 place)

International tournaments
1 place:
 1991: Brunssum Open
 1992: Mello Koolman toernooi  
 1998: Nijmegen Open
 1999: Brunssum Open
 2000: Mello Koolman toernooi and Bijlmertoernooi
 2001: Zeeland Open 
 2002: Zeeland Open
 2003: Leeuwarden
 2018: Brunssum Open
 2019: Brunssum Open

Senegal Championship
 1990 (1 place)
 1992 (1 place)
 2008 (1 place)

External links
 GMI N'Diaga Samb
 NDiaga Samb. Profile at site KNDB
 NDiaga Samb. Profile at site FMJD

References

1966 births
Living people
Senegalese draughts players
Players of international draughts